Acobamba is a town in Peru. It is the capital of Acobamba district, in Acobamba Province of Department of Huancavelica.

According to the 2017 Peru Census, it has a population of 8,980.

References

Populated places in the Huancavelica Region